Thecla Maria Catharina "Thea" Limbach (born 27 February 1959) is a retired speed skater from the Netherlands. She competed at the 1984 Winter Olympics in the 500, 1000, 1500 and 3000 m and finished in 27th, 21st, 9th and 13th place, respectively. She finished third in the KNSB Dutch Allround Championships in 1982, 1984 and 1985; in 1983 she was third in the KNSB Dutch Sprint Championships.

Personal bests:
500 m – 42.6 (1983)
 1000 m –  1:24.12 (1985)
 1500 m –  2:09.59 (1986)
 3000 m –  4:33.96 (1985)
 5000 m –  7:59.68 (1985)

In the 2000s she became Chef de Mission of the Dutch teams at the European Youth Olympic Festival and Paralympic Games (2004 and 2008). She works at the Zuyderzee Lyceum in Emmeloord.

References

1959 births
Living people
Dutch female speed skaters
Speed skaters at the 1984 Winter Olympics
Olympic speed skaters of the Netherlands
Recipients of the Order of Orange-Nassau
People from Harderwijk
Sportspeople from Gelderland
20th-century Dutch women